Daniel M. Oppenheimer is a professor of psychology at Carnegie Mellon University in the Department of Social and Decision Sciences. Previously, he was a professor at the UCLA Anderson School of Management. From 2004 to 2012, he worked at Princeton University's Department of Psychology.

Primarily interested in cognitive psychology, he researches causal discounting, charitable giving, perceptual fluency, and people's perceptions of randomness.  He won the 2006 Ig Nobel Prize in Literature for his paper "Consequences of Erudite Vernacular Utilized Irrespective of Necessity: Problems with Using Long Words Needlessly", which argues that simple writing makes authors appear more intelligent than complex writing. In 2012, he co-authored a book with political scientist Mike Edwards on political psychology and democracy, Democracy Despite Itself: Why A System That Shouldn't Work at All Works So Well.
 	
Oppenheimer earned his BA at Rice University and his MA and PhD from Stanford University.

Books

Notes

Living people
Princeton University faculty
Carnegie Mellon University faculty
Rice University alumni
Stanford University alumni
21st-century American psychologists
Year of birth missing (living people)